Ted-Jonathan Tattermusch (born 8 May 2001) is a German professional footballer who plays as a left winger for Borussia Dortmund II.

Career
Tattermusch made his professional debut for SV Meppen in the 3. Liga on 31 July 2019, coming on as a substitute in the 87th minute for Deniz Undav in the 4–2 away win against Chemnitzer FC.

Personal life
Tattermusch is the son of former Bundesliga footballer Reinhold Tattermusch, who also played for Meppen during his career.

References

External links
 
 

2001 births
Living people
German footballers
Association football forwards
SV Meppen players
Borussia Dortmund II players
3. Liga players